The Irano-Turanian Region is a floristic region located within the Tethyan Subkingdom of the Holarctic Kingdom. It is divided into 12 floristic provinces according to the work of Armen Takhtajan, a Soviet-Armenian botanist who created a classification system for flowering plants. One of the main characteristics of the region is a great diversity and abundance of species, especially in the Iranian Plateau. The region's climate is predominantly continental, with most of the precipitation occurring in the winter and spring.

References

Floristic regions